Platypedia is a genus of cicadas in the family Cicadidae. There are more than 20 described species in Platypedia.

Species
These 24 species belong to the genus Platypedia:

 Platypedia affinis Davis, 1939
 Platypedia aperta Van Duzee, 1915
 Platypedia areolata (Uhler, 1861) (salmonfly)
 Platypedia australis Davis, 1941
 Platypedia balli Davis, 1936
 Platypedia barbata Davis, 1920
 Platypedia bernardinoensis Davis, 1932
 Platypedia falcata Davis, 1920
 Platypedia gressitti Kato, 1932
 Platypedia intermedia Van Duzee, 1915
 Platypedia laticapitata Davis, 1921
 Platypedia mariposa Davis, 1935
 Platypedia middlekauffi Simons, 1953
 Platypedia minor Uhler, 1888
 Platypedia mohavensis Davis, 1920
 Platypedia primigenia Cockerell & T.D.A., 1908
 Platypedia putnami (Uhler, 1877)
 Platypedia rufipes Davis, 1920
 Platypedia scotti Davis, 1935
 Platypedia similis Davis, 1920
 Platypedia sylvesteri Simons, 1953
 Platypedia tomentosa Davis, 1942
 Platypedia usingeri Simons, 1953
 Platypedia vanduzeei Davis, 1920

References

Further reading

External links

 

Articles created by Qbugbot
Platypediini
Cicadidae genera